Q21 may refer to:
 Q21 (New York City bus)
 Al-Anbiya, the twenty-first surah of the Quran
 Chery Q21, a Chinese minivan
 , a Naïade-class submarine